Valujerd (also Romanized as Valūjerd; also known as Valūgerd, Volūgerd, and Warūjird) is a village in Barzrud Rural District, in the Central District of Natanz County, Isfahan Province, Iran. At the 2006 census, its population was 153, in 86 families.

References 

Populated places in Natanz County